= Akkens (motorcycle) =

Akkens motorcycles were manufactured in England between 1919 and 1922, and featured 292cc Union two-stroke engines with deflector-type pistons.
